Frances Vida Lahey MBE (1882—1968) was a prominent artist in Queensland, Australia. She exhibited widely from 1902 until 1965.

Early life
Frances Vida Lahey was born on 26 August 1882 at Pimpama, Queensland, the daughter of David Lahey and his wife, Jane Jemima, (née Walmsley). She had eleven siblings including conservationist Romeo Lahey. She attended Goytelea School at Southport. She studied painting at the Brisbane Central Technical College under Godfrey Rivers. Her uncle financed a trip to New Zealand in 1902 which inspired some of her earliest exhibited works, as well as helping to set her up to study in Melbourne. She studied at the National Gallery School, Melbourne under Bernard Hall and Frederick McCubbin in 1905 and again in 1909.

During World War I, she travelled to London to be in proximity to her brothers and cousins who were serving with the AIF, as well as to study art when she could. She assisted with the volunteer war effort. Following the War, she studied with Frances Hodgkins, in the Colarossi in Paris and in Italy before returning to Australia in 1921.

Career

Vida Lahey was one of the first female artists in Queensland and Australia, who regarded themselves as professionals and who sought to earn a living from practising their art. Vida pioneered art classes for both children and adults in Queensland; and she and Daphne Mayo were responsible for the foundation of the Queensland Art Fund in 1929, which helped to establish an art library and acquire works of art for the state. She travelled to Europe in 1927 for further opportunities to study art. In 1937 Lahey became a foundation member of, and exhibited with, Robert Menzies' anti-modernist organisation, the Australian Academy of Art. Vida was awarded the Society of Artists (NSW) Medal in 1945, in appreciation of good services for the advancement of Australian art, the Coronation Medal in 1953 and in 1958 honoured with an MBE for services to art.

Later life
Vida Lahey's house Wonga Wallen was originally built for her brother Romeo Lahey in Canungra, on a spur of the Darlington Range and was completed in 1920. Later the house was moved from the outskirts to the Canungra township on the hill above the present Catholic Church and occupied by her parents David and Jane Jemima Lahey, and then moved again by Vida and her sister Jayne Lahey in 1946 to its present block in Sir Fred Schonell Drive, St Lucia in Brisbane.

Vida remained at the house Wonga Wallen at St Lucia until her death on 29 August 1968 and was cremated. Wonga Wallen was transferred to the sole ownership of her sister Jayne who remained there until a few years before her death in 1982 during which time another sister, Mavis Denholm née Lahey lived in the house. The house was listed on the Queensland Heritage Register on 21 October 1992.

Works

Vida is known to have painted at least two paintings of the heritage-listed Lahey house, Wonga Wallen, Canungra in the late 1930s and Wonga Wallen Loggia at Canungra in the 1940s both in the collection of Ms Shirley Lahey. Another painting, Bedroom at St Lucia with Dobell portrait, c.1961, was painted by Vida in her St Lucia bedroom.

Collections 
Vida Lahey is represented in major Australian art galleries, including the National Gallery of Australia. Her painting, Monday Morning is part of the Queensland Art Gallery | Gallery of Modern Art Collection.

Exhibitions 
'Songs of Colour: The Art of Vida Lahey', Queensland Art Gallery, Brisbane, 1989.

References

Attribution 

1882 births
1968 deaths
People from the Gold Coast, Queensland
Members of the Order of the British Empire
Articles incorporating text from the Queensland Heritage Register
20th-century Australian women artists
20th-century Australian artists
19th-century Australian women artists
National Gallery of Victoria Art School alumni